Facundo Chapur (Córdoba; December 2, 1993) is an Argentine motor racing driver.

Career 
Chapur began his racing career in 2010 in the minor division (Clase 2) of Turismo Nacional (TN) championship. He won the Clase 2 title in 2012, before moving up to Clase 3 and becoming champion in his rookie season.

As a factory driver for Peugeot Argentina, Chapur won his second title in TN Clase 3 in 2015. He also competed in Super TC2000.

In 2018 and 2019 Chapur was a driver for Citroën Argentina. In 2018, he was runner-up in TN Clase 3 and fifth in Super TC2000 championship. In 2019 and 2020, Chapur was third in TN Clase 3 with MG-C Pergamino team.

Since 2021 he competes in TN Clase 3, TC Pista and TC Pick Up. He is currently trying to ascend to Turismo Carretera, the most important championship in Argentine motorsport.

Racing record

Racing career summary

References

External links 
 
 

1993 births
Living people
Argentine racing drivers
Súper TC 2000 drivers
TC 2000 Championship drivers